Peter Douglas Dawson  (born  4 February 1982 in Pinjarra) is an Australian professional racing cyclist. He was an Australian Institute of Sport scholarship holder.

Major results

2002
 1st, World Championship, Track, Team Pursuit
 1st, Sydney World Cup, Pursuit (AUS)
 2nd, Sydney World Cup, Team Pursuit (AUS)
 1st, Commonwealth Games, Track, Team Pursuit
2003
 1st, World Championship, Track, Team Pursuit
 3rd, Overall, Be Active Instead Criterium Series
2004
 1st, World Championship, Track, Team Pursuit
 1st, Stage 1, Giro delle Regione U23
2005
 1st, Stage 9, Tour of Tasmania
 1st, Moscow World Cup, Team Pursuit
2006
 2nd, National Championship, Track, Pursuit
 2nd, Commonwealth Games, Track, Team Pursuit
 1st, World Championship, Track, Team Pursuit
2007
 3rd, National Championship, Track, Team Sprint
 3rd, National Championship, Track, Team Pursuit
 1st, Stage 1b, Tour de Perth
 International Cycling Classic
 1st, Stage 13
 1st, Stage 17
 Tour of the Murray River
 1st, Stage 5
 1st, Stage 13
 3rd, Sydney World Cup, Team Pursuit
2008
 1st, Los Angeles World Cup, Team Pursuit

References

External links

1982 births
Living people
Australian Institute of Sport cyclists
Australian male cyclists
Cyclists from Western Australia
Cyclists at the 2002 Commonwealth Games
Cyclists at the 2006 Commonwealth Games
Commonwealth Games gold medallists for Australia
Commonwealth Games silver medallists for Australia
People from Pinjarra, Western Australia
Sportsmen from Western Australia
UCI Track Cycling World Champions (men)
Cyclists at the 2004 Summer Olympics
Olympic cyclists of Australia
Commonwealth Games medallists in cycling
Australian track cyclists
Recipients of the Medal of the Order of Australia
20th-century Australian people
21st-century Australian people
Medallists at the 2002 Commonwealth Games